ŽFK Lovćen is a women's football club from Cetinje, Montenegro. Founded at 2010, ŽFK Lovćen plays in the Montenegrin Women's League.

History
While FK Lovćen is the oldest men's club in Montenegro, ŽFK Lovćen is founded at May 2010. Since then, club played and organized numerous tournaments, and on the season 2015-16 for the first time played in Montenegrin Women's League and Montenegrin Cup (women).
On their debut in the First League, ŽFK Lovćen won fifth place among eight clubs. During the season, Lovćen made biggest win in the clubs' history, on 23 September 2015, against ŽFK Cvetex in Berane (5:0).

Record by seasons
Below is a list of ŽFK Lovćen seasons in Montenegrin women's football competitions.

Sources:

See also
Montenegrin Women's League
Montenegrin Cup (women)
Football in Montenegro
FK Lovćen
SD Lovćen Cetinje
Cetinje

References

External links
Official site
Football Association of Montenegro

Lovćen Cetinje
FK Lovćen Cetinje
Women's football clubs in Montenegro